Tonkinia is a genus of air-breathing land snails, terrestrial pulmonate gastropod mollusks in the family Diapheridae.

Distribution 
The distribution of the genus Tonkinia includes:
 north Vietnam

Species
Species within the genus Tonkinia include:
 Tonkinia mirabilis Mabille, 1887
 Tonkinia struposa (Mabille, 1887)

References

 Mabille, J. (1887). Molluscorum Tonkinorum diagnoses. Meulan. 18 pp.
 Bank, R. A. (2017). Classification of the Recent terrestrial Gastropoda of the World. Last update: July 16th, 2017

External links
  Páll-Gergely, B., Hunyadi, A., Grego, J., Sajan, S., Tripathy, B. & Chen, Z.-Y. [Zheyu. (2020). A review of the Diapheridae (Gastropoda: Eupulmonata: Streptaxoidea), with special emphasis on India and Myanmar. Raffles Bulletin of Zoology. 68: 682–718]

Streptaxidae
Taxa named by Jules François Mabille